Marjan Hussein Marjan is the Chief Executive Officer at Kenya's Electoral Agency IEBC. He was confirmed to the post in 8 March 2022 after being pickedfrom a short list of five candidates, and sworn in after a week. Until then, he held the CEO's post in an acting capacity for five years since the exit of Ezra Chiloba in 2017.

Career
Marjan worked at Telkom Kenya for over 20 years as the Head of Internal Audit, Investigation, and Quality. Thereafter, he joined the IEBC in March 2015 after being appointed as Deputy CEO in Charge of Support Services in place of Wilson Sholei. He was then appointed as the Lead Coordinator at the same entity before stepping up to be the acting CEO back on 5 Sep 2017. What followed next was his full elevation as CEO on 8 March 2022. Part of his intray after that appointment was overseeing the 2022 Kenyan general election.

References

External links
 IEBC Secretariat at IEBC

Living people
Year of birth missing (living people)
Kenyan chief executives
University of Nairobi alumni